Eranina meyeri is a species of beetle in the family Cerambycidae. It was described by Martins and Galileo in 1989. It is known from Brazil.

References

Eranina
Beetles described in 1989